R. B. may refer to:

 R. B. (nickname)
 R. B. Winter State Park, park in Pennsylvania

See also
Rb (disambiguation)